Wasylik is a Polish surname. Notable people with the surname include:

Magdalena Wasylik (born 1995), Polish actress
Nick Wasylik (1916–2004), American college football coach
Tesca Andrew-Wasylik (born 1990), Canadian female volleyball player

Polish-language surnames